Extra is an album by Brazilian singer and composer Gilberto Gil, released in 1983. The album, like much of Gil's '80s work, was influenced by reggae.

Track listing
all tracks were written by Gilberto Gil, except where indicated

"Extra"
"E lá poeira" (Banda Um, Gilberto Gil)
"Mar de Copacabana"	 	
"A linha e o linho"	
"Preciso de você"	 	
"Punk da periferia"	 	
"Funk-se quem puder"	 	
"Dono do pedaço" (Gilberto Gil, Waly Salomão, Antônio Cícero)
"Lady Neyde" (Antônio Risério, Gilberto Gil)
"O veado"

Factsheet
Cover: Pictures (front and back cover): Marisa Alvarez Lima
Illustrations (front and back cover): Antonio Homobono
Illustrations (internal): Jejo Cornelses e Ricky Bols
Logo and Art Direction: Rique Nitzsche
Arts: Maysa Manzo e Dulce Bittencourt
Graphic Production LP: Ao Lápis Estúdio

Personnel
Band Um
Bass: Rubens Sabino
Drum Wilson Meirelles
Percussion: Repolho
Guitar: Celso Fonseco
Keyboards and Vocals: Gerson Santos; Jorjão Barreto
Saxophone and Flute: Beto Saroldi
Vocals: Nara Gil e Neila Carneiro

References

1983 albums
Gilberto Gil albums